John Daborne (c.1500 – September 1548) was a merchant and alderman of Guildford Surrey.  He was Mayor of Guildford in 1523, 1531 and 1538/39.

Keeper of Guildford Castle
He became the guardian of Guildford Castle garden in 1544 after the jail that had been in the castle moved to Southwark. His family were involved with the castle for the rest of the 16th century and they are thought to have added the brick windows and fireplaces still seen in the ruins of the castle.

Family
Daborne was born about 1500.  He married his wife Elizabeth about 1519.  He was buried on 1 Sept 1548 at St Mary's, Guildford.  Their daughter Maud married Richard Morris of Suffolk, who was Master of the Ironmongers' Company, London.

References

1548 deaths
16th-century English businesspeople
English merchants
16th-century merchants
People from Guildford
Mayors of places in Surrey
Year of birth uncertain